The Wildcat Branch Petroglyphs are five prehistoric petroglyph carvings located near Fort Gay, West Virginia. They were listed on the National Register of Historic Places in 1979. The petroglyphs are carved on a large rock in the backyard of a private home and are within  of a creek. Four of the carvings depict birds, while the fifth appears to depict a beaver. The carvings were likely made during the Late Woodland period.

References

Archaeological sites on the National Register of Historic Places in West Virginia
National Register of Historic Places in Wayne County, West Virginia
Petroglyphs in West Virginia
Woodland period